Lysionotus is a genus of flowering plants in the family Gesneriaceae (subfamily Didymocarpoideae, tribe Trichosporeae). It occurs in the Himalayas, China, Japan, and Southeast Asia. The genus was described by David Don in 1822.

Species
, Plants of the World Online accepts the following 28 species:

References

External links 
 Description and photos at The Genera of Gesneriaceae (2nd ed.) Weber A, Skog LE (2007 onw.)

Didymocarpoideae
Gesneriaceae genera